Suddilage Kathaawa is a 1985 Sri Lankan film directed by Dharmasiri Bandaranayake and produced by Bandula Gunawardena. The film was based on the novel by reputed writer Simon Navagattegama, who later adapted the novel for the movie. The film stars Swarna Mallawarachchi in lead role along with Cyril Wickramage, Somy Rathnayake and Joe Abeywickrama in supportive roles. The film received critical acclaim and won the award for the Best Film at 1986 Sarasaviya Awards Ceremony.

Plot
Set in 1958, Suddhi (Swarna Mallawarachchi) is married to a notorious criminal in the village, Romial (Cyril Wickramage), who has been taken into the local jail on suspicion of murder. In the meantime, Suddi depends on various men in the village to provide her provisions by sleeping with them. Some time before Romial comes home, Suddi starts sleeping with Mudalali (Somy Rathnayake), a shrewd businessman from town, and he becomes her main lover and provider.

Romial had been hired by Arachchila (Joe Abeywickrama), the local ex-headman, to kill an unnamed villager. Mudalali is married to  Arachchila's only sister, mainly for the respect and the wealth she had inherited. The movie is set in the era of the Grama Niladhari system, which undermines Arachchila's village position, and Mudilali's connection with the new grama  niladhari provokes Arachchila. 

Muralali informs Avusadaya (Ananda Wijesinghe), a tenant farmer who works on Arachchila's land, of the Paddy Lands Act passed through Parliament in Colombo; this new law would force landowners to share the excess land with the landless. This conversation sets forth the conflict between Arachchila and Avusadaya.

Romial returns from jail to the village. Arachchila handed him over the contract to destroy Aushadaya by killing Peter (Salaman Fonseka), the brother of Aushadaya with whom he had regular quarrels after he gets drunk. When Romial hesitates to get back to violence, Suddi encourages him to go ahead with the killings. The murder trap ends with both Peter and Arachchila's deaths. 

However Romial who commits the murder regrets this. He decided to help Peter's wife (Nilanthi Wijesinghe), who is left helpless after Peter's death, and remains unaware about the murder. Soon, Peter's wife falls in love with Romial, while Mudalali and Suddi continue with their affair. Peter's wife informs Romial about the affair between Mudalali and Suddi, and the film ends with an enraged Romial killing Suddi.

Cast
 Swarna Mallawarachchi as Suddi
 Cyril Wickramage as Romial
 Somy Rathnayake as Mudalali
 Joe Abeywickrama as Arachchila 
 Ananda Wijesinghe as Avusadaya
 Salaman Fonseka as Peter
 Nilanthi Wijesinghe as Peter's wife

References

1984 films